The 1984 Australian Formula 2 Championship was a CAMS sanctioned Australian motor racing title open to cars complying with Australian Formula 2 regulations. The title, which was the 17th Australian Formula 2 Championship, was won by Peter Glover, driving a Cheetah Mk 7 Volkswagen.

Schedule
The championship was contested over a six-round series:

The second race of Round 3 at Calder was cancelled due to program delays caused by an accident during a supporting race.

Round 5 at Mallala saw the country South Australian circuit used in a CAMS sanctioned national championship for the first time since 1971.

Points system
Points were awarded on a 30–27–24–21–19–17–15–14–13–12–11–10–9–8–7–6–5 basis to the top 17 finishers in each race. Finishers had to cover at least 75% of the race distance to be awarded points. In multi-race rounds, the aggregate points for each driver were divided by the number of races to determine the actual championship points allocation for the driver at that round.

Results

 Israel did not receive points for his 12th-place finish in Race 1 of Round 3 as he had completed less than the required 75% of the total race distance.
 Glover did not receive points for his 12th-place finish in Race 1 of Round 4 as he had completed less than the required 75% of the total race distance.

Notes and references

External links
 Image of Peter Glover (Cheetah Mk 7), Oran Park, 1984, autopics.com.au, as archived at web.archive.org

Australian Formula 2 Championship
Formula 2 Championship